Bolshoye Brodino is a rural locality (a village) in Sidorovskoye Rural Settlement, Gryazovetsky District, Vologda Oblast, Russia. The population was 9 as of 2002.

Geography 
Bolshoye Brodino is located 30 km east of Gryazovets (the district's administrative centre) by road. Levino is the nearest rural locality.

References 

Rural localities in Gryazovetsky District